The Hawaii Rainbow Wahine basketball team competes in the Big West Conference for the University of Hawaii at Manoa.

Season-by-season results

Postseason appearances

NCAA Tournament appearances
The Rainbow Wahine have appeared in eight NCAA Tournaments, with a combined record of 1–8.

WNIT appearances
The Rainbow Wahine have appeared in eight Women's National Invitation Tournaments, with a combined record of 3–8.

NWIT appearances
The Rainbow Wahine competed in one National Women's Invitational Tournament in 1992 losing to Georgia Tech in the final 72—90.

Retired numbers 
The Rainbow Wahine retired their first number in 2015, honoring number 32 for the program's all-time leader in points and rebounds, Judy Mosley-McAfee.

References

External links